Gummy Bear is the second studio album by Ginger Minj, released by Producer Entertainment Group on June 25, 2021. Fellow RuPaul's Drag Race contestants Eureka O'Hara, Jiggly Caliente, and Katya Zamolodchikova, as well as drag performer Lady Bunny, collaborated on the album.

Promotion
Ginger Minj performed "Gummy Bear" on the premiere of the sixth season of RuPaul's Drag Race All Stars. The song's music video has cameo appearances by fellow Drag Race contestants Eureka O'Hara and Jiggly Caliente, as well as shots of Kathy Najimy, Dustin Milligan, and Chi Chi DeVayne.

Track listing

References

External links
 

2021 albums
LGBT-related albums